Brook Hill is a residential community in York County, Pennsylvania, United States. Brook Hill is one of the neighborhoods of York located in uppermost York Township and has a separate branch known as Brook Hill South.

References

Populated places in York County, Pennsylvania